"Runnin' with the Devil" is a song by the American hard rock band Van Halen. Released as the second single from the band's 1978 eponymous debut album. The song lyrics were inspired by the funk band Ohio Players 1974 song "Runnin' from the Devil". In 2009, "Runnin' with the Devil" was named the 9th greatest hard rock song of all time by VH1. Chuck Klosterman of Vulture ranked it the eighth-best Van Halen song, praising the staccato bass playing as well as David Lee Roth's vocal performance.

Composition
The song begins with a collection of car horns sounding. The horns were taken from the band's own cars and mounted in a box and powered by two car batteries, with a foot switch. Producer Ted Templeman slowed the horns down before adding them to the track. This same idea was first used during the band's club sets and appeared on the Gene Simmons-recorded demo of the song, as well as the song "House of Pain" which preceded it on the demo. A four-measure guitar solo is played after the second and third chorus.

Initial pressings of the Van Halen compilation Best Of, Vol.1 contained an alternate edit of "Runnin' with the Devil" where the verses, chorus and solos were arranged in a different order than that of the original album version. It was reported that this was accidental and subsequent pressings have replaced this version with the one found on Van Halen.

Background
The song's lyrics have often been misinterpreted as being satanic, yet the band members have never revealed the full meaning of the song. It is usually interpreted as being about the life of a touring young band. The song's verses deal with an individual's experience, including learning that a "simple" lifestyle is not as simple as it appears. The lyrics "Runnin' with the devil" are usually interpreted as being a reference to freedom. In the song freedom is portrayed as a lack of social ties and living in the present. The song's meaning has also been interpreted as being an attempt to convince a person that the theme of a simple life is not wrong as it appears. Therefore, the lyrics of "Runnin' with the devil" would not be serious.

Reception
Cash Box said it has "driving guitar work, tough jaunty beat and excellent lead and backing vocals." Record World said that "The production is extremely hot, with a "live" quality to it, and sets off the screaming guitars quite well."

Personnel

Van Halen 
David Lee Roth – vocals
Eddie Van Halen – guitar, backing vocals
Michael Anthony – bass, backing vocals
Alex Van Halen – drums

Charts

References

Further reading

1978 singles
1977 songs
Van Halen songs
Songs written by Michael Anthony (musician)
Songs written by David Lee Roth
Songs written by Alex Van Halen
Songs written by Eddie Van Halen
Song recordings produced by Ted Templeman
Warner Records singles